Hasan Mushrif  is an Indian politician. He is leader of the Nationalist Congress Party and a rural development  and labour minister in the Government of Maharashtra. He is a member of the Maharashtra Legislative Assembly from Kolhapur's Kagal assembly seat.

On 10 January 2017, Mushrif, along with NCP MP Dhananjay Mahadik, former NCP MP Nivedita Sambhajirao Mane, Kolhapur mayor Hasina Faras, and 400 others, were arrested for blocking traffic on the Pune-Bengaluru national highway as part of a protest against the effects of demonetisation.

Political career 
Mushrif has served as the Minister of Labour of the Government of Maharashtra.
Mushrif is currently serving as the Cabinet Minister for Rural Development in the Maharashtra and is a prominent leader of western Maharashtra.

References

Nationalist Congress Party politicians from Maharashtra
Living people
Maharashtra MLAs 2009–2014
People from Kolhapur district
Marathi politicians
Year of birth missing (living people)